Steve Senu Akorli (12 October 1948 – 26 April 2019) was a Ghanaian politician. He was a member of the Third Parliament of the Fourth Republic representing the Ho East Constituency in the Volta Region of Ghana.

Early life and education 
Senu was born on 12 October 1948 at Adakpu Kpetsuon in the Volta Region of Ghana.

Politics 
Senu was elected into the first parliament of the fourth republic of Ghana on 7 January 1993 after he was pronounced winner at the 1992 Ghanaian parliamentary election held on 29 December 1992 on the Ticket of the National Democratic Congress. He represented the Ho East Constituency in the First, Second and Third Parliament of the Fourth Republic.

Career 
Senu was the Minister of State during the Rawlings regime. He was also a former member of Parliament  for the Ho East Constituency from 1992 to 2004 when he resigned his position.

Death 
Senu fell sick on 26 April 2019 and was admitted at the Volta Regional Hospital in Ho but was later taken by Flight to the Korle Bu Teaching Hospital where he died.

He was buried at Adakpu Kpetsuon, his hometown on May 25, 2019.

Personal life 
Senu was married to Judith Victoria Akorli and had six children.

References 

1948 births
2019 deaths
Ghanaian MPs 1993–1997
Ghanaian MPs 1997–2001
Ghanaian MPs 2001–2005
National Democratic Congress (Ghana) politicians
People from Volta Region
Government ministers of Ghana
21st-century Ghanaian politicians